Dr. Ali al-Sartawi (born 1967 in Sarta) is a Palestinian professor and politician.  He served as Minister of Justice in the national unity government of the Palestinian National Authority from the end of March 2007. From 2006 to 2007, he was the Dean of the Faculty of Law at An-Najah National University. Since 1999, he has been a professor of law at An-Najah National University in Nablus, Palestine.

Sartawi is married and has five children.

Notes

1967 births
20th-century Palestinian lawyers
University of Jordan alumni
Living people
Government ministers of the Palestinian National Authority
Academic staff of An-Najah National University
People from Sarta
An-Najah National University alumni
21st-century Palestinian lawyers